= Kolë Mirdita Helenau =

Albanian drama director, poet, and storyteller

Kolë Mirdita Helenau (January 24, 1900 – 1936) was an Albanian drama director, poet and storyteller from Shkodër. He wrote the piece of ”Death of Scanderbeg”. His biography was written in 2011 by Alfred Capakliku. Helenau graduated in the University of Graz in Austria. In 1915, he wrote and published short stories, poetry, drama and tragedies about the death of Skanderbeg. His pseudonym was ”Helenau”. Kol Mirdita died at the age of 36 from tuberculosis.

== Work ==
”The Death of Skandereg” (Vdekja e Skenderbeut) ”The Return of Skandebreg” (Kthimi I Skenderbeut ne Krujë)
